Korea: Battleground for Liberty is a 1959 documentary film about the Korean War directed by John Ford.

External links
Korea: Battleground for Liberty at BFI

Films directed by John Ford